Harwich Port (also spelled Harwichport) is a small seaside community and census-designated place (CDP) situated along Nantucket Sound in the town of Harwich in Barnstable County, Massachusetts, United States. It is named after the port of Harwich in Essex, England. As of the 2010 census, the CDP had a population of 1,644. It is a popular vacation spot on Cape Cod and is home to the Wychmere Beach Club and the Allen Harbor Yacht Club. Also, one of its popular mottos is "Three Harbors, One Port", referencing to Saquatucket, Wychmere, and Allen Harbor, which are all located in Harwich Port. Well known residents include Bill O'Brien, head coach and general manager of the Houston Texans.

Geography
It is bordered by Nantucket Sound to the south, Northwest Harwich to the west, Harwich Center to the north, East Harwich to the northeast, and the town of Chatham to the east. Saquatucket and Wychmere Harbors are located in Harwich Port. Neighboring Allen Harbor, while having a Harwich Port mailing address, is located in the Northwest Harwich CDP.

Demographics

As of the census of 2000, there were 1,809 people, 1,000 households, and 485 families residing in the CDP. The population density was 265.6/km2 (688.1/mi2). There were 2,279 housing units at an average density of 334.6/km2 (866.9/mi2). The racial makeup of the CDP was 97.73% White, 0.61% African American, 0.11% Native American, 0.06% Asian, 0.77% from other races, and 0.72% from two or more races. Hispanic or Latino of any race were 0.66% of the population. During the summer the population almost doubles with the influx of tourists.

There were 1,000 households, out of which 10.7% had children under the age of 18 living with them, 41.4% were married couples living together, 6.5% had a female householder with no husband present, and 51.4% were non-families. 46.9% of all households were made up of individuals, and 29.7% had someone living alone who was 65 years of age or older. The average household size was 1.79 and the average family size was 2.49.

In the CDP, the population was spread out, with 11.3% under the age of 18, 3.6% from 18 to 24, 18.5% from 25 to 44, 25.4% from 45 to 64, and 41.1% who were 65 years of age or older. The median age was 58 years. For every 100 females, there were 74.1 males. For every 100 females age 18 and over, there were 71.9 males.

The median income for a household in the CDP was $29,583, and the median income for a family was $45,385. Males had a median income of $31,250 versus $33,229 for females. The per capita income for the CDP was $25,085. About 9.9% of families and 14.6% of the population were below the poverty line, including 44.1% of those under age 18 and 6.7% of those age 65 or over.

References

Harwich, Massachusetts
Census-designated places in Barnstable County, Massachusetts
Census-designated places in Massachusetts
Populated coastal places in Massachusetts